A cane gun is a walking cane with a hidden gun built into it. Cane guns are sometimes confused with so-called "poacher's guns".

These are usually a more portable and more easily concealed version of conventional sporting guns, commonly a single or double-barrelled shotgun based on the relatively affordable Belgian leClercq action.

In this and in similar designs, a folding shotgun with a modest barrel length can be made to fold back until it lies beneath the stock and, thus, easily carried under a coat.

An alternative form is in effect a very long-barrelled pistol fitted with a detachable, sometimes called "take-down", or folding skeleton stock, though any sporting weapon that requires assembly has obvious drawbacks in the field.

In purely practical terms, the distinction is that cane guns, far more costly to produce and, generally speaking, an affectation, ostensibly carried by gentlemen who wished, at all times, to be able to take "targets of opportunity", were a curio, a talking point, or a concealed offensive weapon, one that might easily escape detection unless closely examined. In addition to gentleman's canes, guns have been concealed in umbrellas, parasols, and walking staffs.

By contrast, a poacher's gun is very obviously a weapon, albeit one easily concealed by those legitimately going about in the countryside unarmed, by those who carried a gun for ad hoc hunting for the pot or for self-defense, as opposed to a far-less-portable, pure-game gun, though these cross into the survival category.

Cane guns are now very rare and difficult to find since most fall afoul of legislation prohibiting concealed weapons, and period examples, where permitted, are, generally speaking, in the hands of private collectors and museums.

Modern, cartridge-type cane guns are usually fitted to fire large, low-pressure (black powder or equivalent) handgun ammunition or shotgun cartridges between .410 up to 12-gauge, both of which are well-suited in a weapon that is effectively just a barrel with an integrated chamber, a manual ejection, a detachable firing mechanism, a rudimentary grip, and even more rudimentary sights in some cases.

Other types of cane guns have been produced as air weapons, generally using some form of detachable pressurized air reservoir (a pneumatic air weapon) in the form of a flask, or integrated into the form of a more generously proportioned stick, such as a traditional shillelagh. Some are effectively dart-firing blowpipes, which are far easier to disguise being little more than a hollow tube. The weapon was used during a bank hold-up as part of the Pizza Bomber Case.

Cane guns have an abiding place in spy culture; a famous example appeared in Ian Fleming's 1953 novel Casino Royale, in which James Bond is threatened with one during his contest at the gaming table with Le Chiffre. The cane gun also appears in the made-for-television adaption of the same name in 1954 as well as in the 1999 Bond movie The World Is Not Enough.

According to the ATF, cane guns, sword guns, and umbrella guns are classified as AOW (any other weapons).

See also 
 Swordstick

References

Firearms
Walking sticks